The 42º Rally RACC Catalunya - Costa Daurada, the fourth round of the 2006 World Rally Championship season, took place from March 24 to 26, 2006.

Report 
The rally was the first all-tarmac event of the season. The event was marred by an accident in the JWRC category which resulted in the death of the co-driver Jörg Bastuck. Eventually the rally saw the second win of the season for the reigning world champion Sébastien Loeb, although the early pacesetter was Ford's Marcus Grönholm. After winning the first three stages, he suffered turbo problems on stage five but fought back from tenth place to eventually take third place. Ahead of Grönholm  was the first podium for Spain's Dani Sordo with a fast run that was publicly acknowledged by Loeb. Further down the field, the twice previous Rally Catalunya winner Gilles Panizzi disappointed with a tenth-place finish. Panizzi promptly left the Red Bull Škoda Team and has not competed in a WRC round since.

Results

Retirements

  Xavier Pons - accident (SS10)
  Luca Betti - accident (SS12)
  Julien Pressac - engine (SS12)
  Barry Clark - withdrawn (SS2)
  Aaron Burkart - accident (SS2)

Special stages
All dates and times are CET (UTC+1) from 24 to 25 March 2006 and CEST (UTC+2) in 26 March 2006.

Championship standings after the event

Drivers' championship

Manufacturers' championship

References

External links

 Results at eWRC.com
 Results from the official site wrc.com
 Results at Jonkka's World Rally Archive

Catalunya
2006
Catalunya Rally